Dear Goddamned Friends is a 1994 Italian comedy film directed by Mario Monicelli. It was entered into the 44th Berlin International Film Festival where it won an Honourable Mention.

Plot
In 1944 in Tuscany, a group of boxers facing the disasters of the Second World War, during the intrusive presence of the Germans and the Americans, organizes rigged matches to make some money and travel from town to town, hoping to participate in local fairs. A young black American soldier, believed missing, and a girl who refused to marry accompany the ramshackle group.

Cast
 Paolo Villaggio as Dieci
 Massimo Ceccherini as Marlini
 Vittorio Rap as Callicchero
 Marco Graziani as Calamai
 Giuseppe Oppedisano as Taddei
 Elijah Raynard Childs as Washington
 Béatrice Macola as Testa di rapa
 Antonella Ponziani as Wilma
 Stefano Davanzati as Drago
 Paolo Hendel as Rag. Fortini
 Novello Novelli as Zingaro
 Eva Grimaldi as Topona
 Sergio Pierattini as Poeta

References

External links

Dear Goddamned Friends at Variety Distribution

1994 films
1990s Italian-language films
Italian road comedy-drama films
1990s road comedy-drama films
Films directed by Mario Monicelli
Films set in Tuscany
Films set in 1944
Italian boxing films
Films with screenplays by Suso Cecchi d'Amico
1994 comedy films
1994 drama films
1990s Italian films